Benjamin McCoy House, also known as Banbury Cross, is a historic home located near Cassatt, Kershaw County, South Carolina. It was built about 1820, and is a two-story I-house.  It has heavy timber-frame construction and brick exterior brick chimneys.

It was listed on the National Register of Historic Places in 1980.

References

Houses on the National Register of Historic Places in South Carolina
Houses completed in 1820
Houses in Kershaw County, South Carolina
National Register of Historic Places in Kershaw County, South Carolina